PageGroup is a British-based recruitment business. It is headquartered in Weybridge, Surrey and is a constituent of the FTSE 250 Index.

History
The company was formed in 1976 by Michael Page and Bill McGregor, who placed accountants into permanent positions in the United Kingdom. Initially, the pair worked in London, but by 1979 had opened offices in Manchester, Birmingham, Glasgow, Leeds and Bristol.

In 1985, an office was opened in Australia, and the organisation opened in France in 1986. In 1983, Michael Page International was first listed on the Unlisted Securities Market. Michael Page was admitted to the London Stock Exchange in 1988.

Michael Page retired in 1995, with Terry Benson appointed as Chief Executive in 1990. In 1997, the company was acquired by Spherion Corporation (formerly Interim Services Inc.).

PageGroup was demerged from Spherion Corporation in 2001. In 2006, Terry Benson resigned, and Steve Ingham was appointed Chief Executive.

In October 2012, Michael Page International rebranded as PageGroup.

In November 2016, PageGroup was hacked when a development server operated by Capgemini was attacked.

Operations
PageGroup is a provider of permanent, contract and temporary recruitment for clerical professionals, qualified professionals and executives across various disciplines. The company has four operational brands: Michael Page, Page Executive, Page Personnel and Page Outsourcing. The company operates in 36 countries globally.

References

External links
 Official Corporate site

Companies based in Surrey
Business services companies established in 1976
Companies listed on the London Stock Exchange
Employment agencies of the United Kingdom
Executive search firms
1976 establishments in England